The keepers, curators, and honorary curators of the Yorkshire Museum are responsible for curation of the museum's collection.

History of the role
The keepers are professional curators and related academics. When the museum was founded there was one Keeper of the museum supported by the Sub-Curator and various Honorary Curators. The last Keeper of the Museum was George Willmot in 1970, after which time each department in the museum had its own keeper and the museum was run by one curator. Since the founding of York Museums Trust in 2002, each department has been led by a curator and there is no longer a role of keeper.

References

Yorkshire Museum, keepers and curators of the
Yorkshire Museum people